Oleg Vladimirovich Galkin, also Oleh Halkin (1 May 1965 – 10 May 2003) was a Soviet and Ukrainian cyclist. His name was spelled Oleh Halkin as transliterated from Ukrainian when he competed for post-Soviet Ukraine.

In 1990 he was world champion (as part of the ) in 100km team racing and bronze medalist in 1989. He competed in the 100 km. team time trial at the 1992 Summer Olympics for the Unified Team, which took 4th place.

Biography
Galkin was born and raised in Ishim, Tyumen Oblast, where he graduated from school #8.  In 1987 he graduated from Kiev State Institute of Physical Culture. He is merited master of sports (1990). In 1990s he moved to Canada. He spent his last years in Kiev suffering from leukemia.  He is interred at the Baikove Cemetery, Kiev. Since 2012, the annual open championship of Ishim in cycling dedicated to the memory of Galkin has been organized.

References

External links
 

1965 births
2003 deaths
Soviet male cyclists
Ukrainian male cyclists
Olympic cyclists of the Unified Team
Cyclists at the 1992 Summer Olympics
Burials at Baikove Cemetery